This is a list of Bangladeshi films that are scheduled to release in 2023. Some films have announced release dates but have yet to begin filming, while others are in production but do not yet have definite release dates. Films listed as "untitled" do not yet have publicly announced titles.

Box office collection
The top ten highest-grossing Bangladeshi films released in 2023, by worldwide box office gross revenue, are as follows.

Background color  indicates the current releases

January–March

April–June

July–September

October–December

Unreleased/Scheduled to Release

See also

 List of Bangladeshi films of 2022
 List of Bangladeshi films of 2021
 List of Bangladeshi films of 2020
 List of Bangladeshi films
 Cinema of Bangladesh

References

Film
Lists of 2023 films by country or language
 2023